The Health Insurance Authority is the regulatory body for private health insurance in Ireland. The Authority's remit is to monitor and research health insurance generally; operate the risk equalisation scheme; advise the Minister on health insurance generally; monitor the operation of other relevant regulations as prescribed and safeguard the interests of current and future health insurance consumers.

The Authority was established on 1 February 2001 in accordance with the terms of the Health Insurance Act, 1994 by Micheál Martin TD, then the Minister for Health and Children. The Members were appointed following consultation with relevant industry, professional and consumer rights representatives.  It is meant to be independent in the exercise of its functions and it is required to make a report of its activities to the Minister who will lay the report before each house of the Oireachtas.

It is composed of a chairperson and four members.

References

External links
 Health Insurance Authority

Medical and health organisations based in the Republic of Ireland
Health insurance in Ireland
Insurance regulation
Regulation in Ireland